Lydia Schaap is a retired Dutch freestyle swimmer who won a bronze medal in the 4 × 100 m freestyle relay at the 1966 European Championships.

References

Year of birth missing (living people)
1940s births
Living people
Dutch female freestyle swimmers
European Aquatics Championships medalists in swimming
Swimmers from Amsterdam
20th-century Dutch women